New Roads (historically ) is a city in and the parish seat of Pointe Coupee Parish, Louisiana, United States. The center of population of Louisiana was located in New Roads in 2000. The population was 4,831 at the 2010 census, down from 4,966 in 2000. The city's ZIP code is 70760. It is part of the Baton Rouge Metropolitan Statistical Area.

History 

Le Poste de Pointe Coupée ("the Pointe Coupée Post" or Cut Point Post) is one of the oldest communities in the Mississippi River Valley established by European colonists. The trading post was founded in the 1720s by settlers from France. It was located upstream from the point crossed by explorers, immediately above but not circled by False River. The name referred to the area along the Mississippi River northeast of what is now New Roads.

The post was initially settled by native French, as well as French-speaking Creoles born in the colony. Additional ethnically French settlers migrated down the Mississippi River from Fort de Chartres, Upper Louisiana. The colonists imported numerous African slaves from the French West Indies (Guadeloupe, Martinique, Saint-Domingue), and many directly from Africa, as workers for the plantations.

Historian Gwendolyn Midlo Hall discovered extensive French and Spanish documentation of the early slave trade, which provided more information than is usually available as to the ethnicity and names of individual slaves, all in the court house at New Roads. Using this and other research, she has produced "The Louisiana Slave Database and the Louisiana Free Database: 1719–1820," which is searchable on line.

Commandants of Pointe Coupee (1729–1762)
1729: Chevalier Henri du Loubois
1731: Jean Baptiste François Tisserand de Moncharvaux
1734–38: Claude Joseph de Favrot
1738–1742: Jean Louis Richard de la Houssaye
1742–1744: Claude Joseph de Favrot
1744–1753: Jean Joseph Delfau de Pontalba, a relative by marriage of Micaela Almonester, Baroness de Pontalba, the New Orleans native who in the mid-19th century built the Pontalba Buildings and redesigned Jackson Square.
1753: Chevalier Morlière
1753–1756: Francois Artaud
1756–1759: Pierre Benoist, Sieur Payen de Noyan de Chavoy
1759–1762: Jean Louis Richard de la Houssaye

Spanish rule 
After several floods, Governor Luis de Unzaga in 1772 moved the European settlement from Pointe Coupee to a new post, the so-called Post Unzaga. Recently, historians Frank Cazorla and J. David Polo, from the Louis de Unzaga Historical Society research team, using satellite remote sensing techniques and comparative plans from the General Archive of the Indies, have managed to locate the position of the Unzaga post, which included, along with it , a parish. Unfortunately after the slave rebellion of 1795 this settlement was left uninhabited. 

After Great Britain defeated France in the Seven Years' War (also known as the French and Indian War in North America), France ceded this territory to Spain.

In 1791, the Mina (an African people) slave uprising, the Mina Conspiracy, started on the estate of Widow Robillard at New Roads. Three years later, there was another area slave revolt near Point Coupee, the Pointe Coupée Conspiracy.

Louisiana Purchase 
In 1803 the United States made the Louisiana Purchase, and the territory became part of the United States. In-migration of American settlers increased, changing Louisiana culture.

In 1822, Catherine Dispau (a free woman of color called "La Fille Gougis") made a four or six block subdivision out of her False River plantation. This was located at the terminus of a "new road" linking False River with the older Mississippi River settlement to the north.  This is the area now bounded by West Main, New Roads, West Second and St. Mary Streets. The latter was named for St. Mary's Catholic Church, founded in 1823. The community was referred to variously as the "village of St. Mary" or Chemin Neuf.

The founding of the church helped the community develop. In 1847, New Roads was named as the seat of Pointe Coupée Parish, and a courthouse was built. Between these "strong celestial poles," the Main Street business district developed. After the abandonment of the competing parish port of Waterloo during 1882–84 due to flooding, New Roads became the major commercial port and city of Pointe Coupée Parish. The railroad reached the city in 1898–99, bringing much industrial development.

The official name of the community changed frequently during the years after Louisiana became part of the United States. The first post office was established in 1858 as "False River," but it was discontinued in 1861. When the town was incorporated by the state legislature in 1875, it was named "New Roads." But, in 1878, when the post office reopened, it was named "St. Mary's." In 1879, the city and post office name was changed to New Roads. The old incorporation fell into disuse. The city was reincorporated in 1892, and received its charter two years later. Several names were proposed, among them "St. Mary" and "Rose Lake."  But "New Roads" was finally chosen, although it was often misspelled "New Rhodes."

Since its founding, New Roads has been the hub of an agricultural community that cultivated commodity crops of sugar cane, cotton, and pecans, among others. Today, the economy has grown to support large industries such as healthcare and social assistance, construction, and retail facilities.

Geography

Levee breaks or "crevasses" on the Mississippi River to the north and east overbanked False River and submerged all of New Roads in 1867, 1882 and 1884. The 1882 flood was the most severe, with four feet of water standing in Main Street during the height of the crisis. During the floods of 1912 and 1927, however, the southern portion of the town, including the main business district, remained dry, as the flood waters to the north and east were held back by the Texas & Pacific Railroad embankment. Mid-city flooding had periodically occurred during hurricanes and other heavy rainfall events due to the overbanking of the Portage Canal, the lowest part of the city.

Demographics

As of the 2020 United States census, there were 4,549 people, 1,692 households, and 1,034 families residing in the city. As of the census of 2000, there were 4,966 people, 1,818 households, and 1,243 families residing in the city. The racial makeup of the city was 38.99% White, 59.32% African American, 0.22% Native American, 0.79% Asian, 0.16% from other races, and 0.52% from two or more races. Hispanic or Latino of any race were 0.62% of the population.

There were 1,818 households, out of which 33.2% had children under the age of 18 living with them, 40.4% were married couples living together, 23.6% had a female householder with no husband present, and 31.6% were non-families. 28.8% of all households were made up of individuals, and 14.7% had someone living alone who was 65 years of age or older. The average household size was 2.61 and the average family size was 3.24.

In the city, the population was spread out, with 27.4% under the age of 18, 9.0% from 18 to 24, 24.0% from 25 to 44, 21.0% from 45 to 64, and 18.6% who were 65 years of age or older. The median age was 38 years. For every 100 females, there were 82.8 males. For every 100 females age 18 and over, there were 75.0 males.

The median income for a household in the city was $24,583, and the median income for a family was $31,250. Males had a median income of $32,679 versus $20,547 for females. The per capita income for the city was $14,840. About 23.6% of families and 30.3% of the population were below the poverty line, including 40.3% of those under age 18 and 22.7% of those age 65 or over.

Government 
From 1960 to 1978, the mayor of New Roads was William Haile "Booty" Scott, Sr. During his administration, New Roads and the Pointe Coupee Parish Police Jury acquired property on which to construct facilities. Scott died in office in 1978.  

Scott's wife, Trina Olinde Scott (1920-2016), was appointed to fill out his term, becoming New Roads' first female mayor. She was thereafter elected to two full terms of her own. A former educator who attended H. Sophie Newcomb Memorial College in New Orleans and Louisiana State University in Baton Rouge, Trina Scott helped revitalize Main Street, increase the size and effectiveness of the police force, and expand the municipal boundaries. Under her administration, New Roads was elevated from town to city status and the city and parish erected the Scott Civic Center, False River Regional Airport, playgrounds, and sports parks.

Scott was succeeded by Sylvester Muckelroy, the first African American to hold the office. 

In 2010, Robert Myer, also an African American, was elected mayor. On August 3, 2016, Myer was indicted by a Pointe Coupee Parish grand jury on nine counts of malfeasance in office and abuse of power. From 2011 to 2014, Myer allegedly used a city-issued credit card for personal reasons. He also allegedly permitted the former municipal finance director to use the card in exchange for sexual favors.

Notable people

Hewitt Leonidas Bouanchaud, politician, served as Lieutenant Governor and state House Speaker
Brian J. Costello, humanitarian and author of more than two dozen books on Louisiana and European history, culture and religion, is a native and lifelong resident of New Roads
Shelton Fabre, 4th bishop of the Roman Catholic Diocese of Houma–Thibodaux
Ernest J. Gaines, African-American fiction writer, writer-in-residence at the University of Louisiana at Lafayette
Jonas Gaines, baseball pitcher in the Negro leagues
J. Thomas Jewell, member of the Louisiana House of Representatives, 1936–1968; House Speaker, 1960–1964; resided in New Roads
John Archer LeJeune, Lieutenant General of the United States Marines, was born in 1867 at Raccourci-Old River, approximately 25 miles north of New Roads. Marine Camp LeJeune in North Carolina is named in his honor, and statues representing him are located there and on the grounds of the Pointe Coupee Parish Courthouse in New Roads.
Catherine D. Kimball, former chief justice of the Louisiana Supreme Court, former New Roads resident, retired in Ventress
Clyde Kimball, former member of the Louisiana House of Representatives for Pointe Coupee and West Baton Rouge parishes; husband of Catherine Kimball
DeLesseps Story Morrison, former New Orleans Mayor, was born in New Roads.
Julien Poydras, a merchant, planter, poet, statesman, banker, and philanthropist, helped to establish the state's first public schools in Pointe Coupee Parish in the early 19th century. He endowed a trust fund to provide impoverished brides with dowries in Pointe Coupee and West Baton Rouge parishes.
Albin Provosty, district attorney and from 1912 to 1920 a member of the Louisiana State Senate, publisher of The Pointe Coupee Banner
Patrick Queen Middle linebacker for the Baltimore Ravens

References

External links

 City of New Roads
 Gwendolyn Midlo Hall, "The Louisiana Slave Database and the Louisiana Free Database: 1719-1820", iBiblio website 
 Pointe Coupee Tourism
 Pointe Coupee Chamber of Commerce

Cities in Louisiana
Cities in Pointe Coupee Parish, Louisiana
Parish seats in Louisiana
Cities in the Baton Rouge metropolitan area